Harwinton is a town in Litchfield County, Connecticut, United States. The population was 5,484 at the 2020 census. The high school is Lewis S. Mills.

History
The town incorporated in 1737. The name of the town alludes to Hartford, Windsor and Farmington, Connecticut (HAR + WIN + TON).

Geography
Harwinton is in eastern Litchfield County; it is bordered to the northwest by the city of Torrington and to the east by Burlington in  Hartford County.

The town is bordered to the west by the Naugatuck River. The southeastern portion of the town contains the Roraback Wildlife Area and several reservoirs.

Principal communities
Campville
Harwinton Center (part of Northwest Harwinton CDP)

Demographics

As of the census of 2000, there were 5,283 people, 1,958 households, and 1,546 families living in the town. The racial makeup of the town was 98.69% White, 0.08% African American, 0.06% Native American, 0.51% Asian, 0.06% Pacific Islander, 0.13% from other races, and 0.47% from two or more races. Hispanic or Latino of any race were 0.89% of the population.

There were 1,958 households, out of which 33.7% had children under the age of 18 living with them, 70.6% were married couples living together, 5.2% had a female householder with no husband present, and 21.0% were non-families. 17.2% of all households were made up of individuals, and 8.4% had someone living alone who was 65 years of age or older.  The average household size was 2.70 and the average family size was 3.05.

In the town, the population was spread out, with 25.1% under the age of 18, 5.2% from 18 to 24, 27.4% from 25 to 44, 29.3% from 45 to 64, and 13.0% who were 65 years of age or older.  The median age was 41 years. For every 100 females, there were 100.7 males.  For every 100 females age 18 and over, there were 98.4 males.

The median income for a household in the town was $66,222, and the median income for a family was $75,912. Males had a median income of $51,597 versus $40,000 for females. The per capita income for the town was $32,137.  About 0.8% of families and 2.2% of the population were below the poverty line, including none of those under age 18 and 3.4% of those age 65 or over.

Transportation
Connecticut Route 4 connects the town to Torrington in the northwest and to Hartford in the east. Route 118 connects the town westward to Litchfield center, with a junction for the Route 8 expressway in the western part of Harwinton. Route 222 runs south from Harwinton to Thomaston center. Route 72 leads south then east to the city of Bristol.

Notable people

 Harry C. Bentley (1877–1967), founder of Bentley University
 Jonathan Brace (1754–1837), judge and U.S. congressman 
 George S. Catlin (1808–1851), U.S. congressman
 Collis Potter Huntington (1821–1900), one of four men who formed the Central Pacific Railroad
 Elam Luddington (1806–1893), Mormon pioneer to Utah and the first Mormon missionary to preach in Thailand
 Luman Watson (1790–1834), clockmaker
 Abner Wilcox (1808–1869), missionary teacher to the Kingdom of Hawaii

References

External links

 
 Military service in early Harwinton
 Description of Harwinton from The Connecticut Guide, 1935

 
Towns in Litchfield County, Connecticut
Towns in the New York metropolitan area
Towns in Connecticut